Part three may refer to:

 Part 3 (KC and the Sunshine Band album)
 Part III (2001 album), R&B album by 112
 Part III of the Mathematical Tripos
 Stardust Crusaders, the third story arc of the Japanese manga series JoJo's Bizarre Adventure, written and illustrated by Hirohiko Araki, later adapted to an anime as JoJo's Bizarre Adventure: Stardust Crusaders.
 Part 3 (Twin Peaks)

See also
 PT3 (disambiguation)